Samekh   (Phoenician sāmek  ; Hebrew samekh  , Syriac semkaṯ) is the fifteenth letter of the Semitic abjads, including the Hebrew alphabet. 

Samekh represents a voiceless alveolar fricative . In the Hebrew language, the samekh has the same pronunciation as the left-dotted shin.

The numerical value of samekh is 60.

History
The Phoenician letter may continue a glyph from the Middle Bronze Age alphabets, either based on a hieroglyph for a tent peg or support, possibly the  djed "pillar" hieroglyph
(c.f. Hebrew root סמך s-m-kh 'support', סֶמֶךְ semekh 'support, rest', סוֹמֵךְ somekh 'support peg, post', סוֹמְכָה somkha 'armrest', סָמוֹכָה smokha 'stake, support', indirectly s'mikhah ; Aramaic סַמְכָא samkha 'socket, base', סְמַךְ smakh 'support, help'; Syriac  ܣܡܟܐ  semkha 'support').

The shape of samek undergoes complicated developments. 
In archaic scripts, the vertical stroke can be drawn either across or below the three horizontal strokes.
The closed form of Hebrew samek is developed only in the Hasmonean period.

The Phoenician letter gave rise to the Greek xi (Ξ), whereas its name may also be reflected in the name of the otherwise unrelated Greek letter sigma.

The archaic "grid" shape of Western Greek xi was adopted in the early Etruscan alphabet (𐌎 esh), but was never included in the Latin alphabet.

Syriac semkat
The Syriac letter semkaṯ  develops from the Imperial Aramaic "hook" shape 
into a rounded form by the 1st century. The Old Syriac form further develops into a connected cursive both in the Eastern and Western script variants.

Hebrew Samekh
Hebrew Samekh develops a closed cursive form in the middle Hasmonean period (1st century BC). This becomes the standard form in early Herodian hands.

Talmudic legend
In Talmudic legend, samekh is said to have been a miracle of the Ten Commandments.  records that the tablets "were written on both their sides." The Jerusalem Talmud interprets this as meaning that the inscription went through the full thickness of the tablets. The stone in the center parts of the letters ayin and teth should have fallen out, as these letters are closed in the ktav ivri script and would not be connected to the rest of the tablet, but miraculously remained in place. The Babylonian Talmud (tractate Shabbat 104a) also cites the opinion that these closed letters included samekh, attributed to Rav Chisda (d. ca. 320).

Arabic Sīn & Nabataean Simkath
Samekh has no surviving descendant in the Arabic alphabet, it was replaced by the letter س Sīn, a letter variant of the letter ش Šīn.

Šīn is positioned at its original 21st spot in the Arabic abjadi sequence, while its variant Sīn replaced Samekh at 15th position, with the numerical value of the replaced letter Samekh also assigned to its replacement letter Sīn.

The Nabataean alphabet, however, which is the immediate predecessor to the Arabic alphabet, contained the letter Simkath 𐢖‎.

Character encodings

References

Phoenician alphabet
Hebrew letters